The discography of American recording artist and YouTuber Todrick Hall consists of six studio albums, two soundtrack albums, two reissues, one live album, five extended plays, and 36 singles.

Albums

Studio albums

Reissues

Soundtrack albums

Live albums

Extended plays

Singles

As lead artist

As featured artist

Other charted songs

Other appearances

Notes

References

Discographies of American artists
Pop music discographies